Woh Humsafar Tha (lit. He was [my] co-journeyer) is a ghazal written in 1971 by Naseer Turabi. It serves as the title song for the Pakistani drama serial Humsafar. The ghazal was originally sung by Abida Parveen and later by Qurat-ul-Ain Balouch.

Background 
This ghazal was written in 1971 after the Fall of Dhaka. The poem's lyrics describe the writer's feelings regarding the separation of East Pakistan.

Production
Who Humsafar Tha was first sung as a ghazal by Abida Parvin in the late 1970s. More recently, it was sung by Qurat-ul-Ain Balouch and used as the title song for the Urdu Drama Hamsafar. The lines of the song are frequently used during the course of the show.

Popularity
Upon the release of the Hamsafar drama, the ghazal Woh Humsafar tha (sung by Quratul Ain Baloch) topped charts in Pakistan along with some other nations and captured a positive reviews from both critics and audience. The song was also a huge hit in India when the serial Humsafar was broadcast on the Indian channel Zindagi in 2014.

Awards 
In 2012, Qurat-ul-Ain Balouch won two Lux Style Awards at 11th Lux Style Awards for Woh Humsafar Tha.

References 

1971 songs
Urdu-language songs
Pakistani songs